Acylphosphatase-1 is an enzyme that in humans is encoded by the ACYP1 gene.

Function 

Acylphosphatase is a small cytosolic enzyme that catalyzes the hydrolysis of the carboxyl-phosphate bond of acylphosphates. Two isoenzymes have been isolated, called muscle acylphosphatase and erythrocyte acylphosphatase, on the basis of their tissue localization. This gene encodes the erythrocyte acylphosphatase isoenzyme. Alternatively spliced transcript variants that encode different proteins were identified through data analysis.

References

External links

Further reading 

 
 
 
 
 

Human proteins